Castelnaudary is a commune in the Aude department in the Occitanie region of southern France. It is located in the former province of the Lauragais and famous for cassoulet of which it claims to be the world capital, and of which it is a major producer.

Geography
Castelnaudary is a market town, and the capital of the territory of Lauragais. This route has been used since at least Roman times, and today carries road, motorway (A61), rail and canal links. Castelnaudary is the main port of the Canal du Midi to which it owed a period of prosperity in the 17th century when agricultural and manufactured produce became easier to export. The Grand Bassin in the town is at 7 ha the largest open area of water in the canal, and is today its major pleasure port. Castelnaudary station has rail connections to Toulouse, Carcassonne and Narbonne.

History

Roman staging post
In Roman times the location of the town was a staging post on the Narbonne-Toulouse road, and called Sostomagus.

Origin of the name
Castelnaudary comes from the Occitan Castèlnòu d'Arri — Latin translation Castellum Novum Arri — meaning "Arrius' new castle".

Major events
 1103. First official mention of a settlement at Castelnaudary.
 1211. During the Albigensian Crusade, Simon de Montfort, 5th Earl of Leicester is besieged in Castelnaudary by the Count of Toulouse and the Count of Foix.
 1235. Arrival of the Papal inquisition whose initial attempts to identify and persecute Cathars were unsuccessful due to the solidarity of the townsfolk.
 31 October 1355. During the 100 Years War, the town is sacked by the Black Prince who travelling from Bordeaux, ravaged the weaker towns of Gascony and then the Lauragais as far as Narbonne.  The town was pillaged and the inhabitants massacred. The town's walls were not rebuilt until 10 years later.
 1477. The town becomes the capital of the comté of Lauragais under Louis XI of France.
 1632. The capture of Henri II de Montmorency just outside the town leads to his execution at Toulouse on the orders of Cardinal Richelieu.
 15 May 1681. Commissioning of the Canal du Midi.
 1754. Construction of L'Ile de la Cybèle.
 1814. Marshal Soult withdraws to the town after the Battle of Toulouse before signing a final surrender at Naurouze.

Population
Its inhabitants are called Chauriens.

Sights
 L'Apothicairerie de l'Hôpital
 La Collégiale Saint-Michel
 Les Ecluses Saint-Roch
 Le Grand Bassin
 La Halle aux Grains
 L'Ile de la Cybèle.
 Le Moulin de Cugarel
 La Légion étrangère
 Le Présidial
 La Chapelle Notre-Dame de Pitié

Personalities
Castelnaudary was the birthplace of:
 Pierre de Castelnau d. 1208
 Pierre-Jean Fabre (1588-1658), physician to King Louis XIII
 Philippe de Rigaud Vaudreuil (1643–1725)
 Joseph Martin-Dauch (1741–1801), the only deputy from the Estates General of the Third Estate known to have signed as 'opposant' from taking the Tennis Court Oath, a major event of the French Revolution of 1789
Jean François Aimé Dejean (1749-1824), army officer and minister of state in the service of the First French Republic and the First French Empire
 Antoine-François Andréossy (1761–1828)
 Antoine Marfan (1858–1942), pediatrician
 Georges Canguilhem (1904–1995), philosopher and member of the Académie française who specialized in the philosophy of science

Education 
 École nationale de l'aviation civile

Military base
The 4th Foreign Regiment of the French Army has been stationed in Castelnaudary since 1976, and the base is open to the public on 30 April (Camerone Day) and at Christmas.

Cassoulet

Castelnaudary styles itself Capitale Mondiale du Cassoulet ("World Capital of Cassoulet") and the apocryphal legend of the genesis of this dish (originally called estofat) relates that it was first served to the defenders of the town during the siege of 1355.

The town is home to the La Grande Confrérie du Cassoulet de Castelnaudary ("The Brotherhood of Castelnaudary's cassoulet"), an organization which seeks to promote and preserve  the dish and its associated traditions.  An annual festival celebrating cassoulet "fête du Cassoulet" is held in the last full week of August; the town center is thusly crowded with various versions of the traditional dish on that date.

The cassoulet variant favored in this town is based on the local haricot bean (which is the subject of a protected status application). It also includes goose or duck confit, pork, and Toulouse sausage.

Traditional peasant versions of the recipe can take two days or more to prepare. The traditional cooking vessel is an eponymous earthenware pot called a "cassole."

Rick Stein featured the Castelnaudary cassoulet in an episode of Rick Stein's French Odyssey and his recipe can be found on the BBC Food website.

References

External links

 Castelnaudary (in French)
 Castelnaudary Tourisme (in French)

Communes of Aude
Languedoc
Aude communes articles needing translation from French Wikipedia